The Gift is an Australian children's television series that first screened on the Nine Network Australia in 1997. It featured 26 half-hour episodes produced by Barron Entertainment Ltd. The show reaired on the ABC in December 1998, and on ABC3 in 2011.

Synopsis
The Gift is passed on from one person to the next and gives the carrier the power to do anything they dream. When the Gift carrier discovers the Gift's true potential they have to pass it on to someone else.

Cast
 Peter Rowsthorn as Raff 
 Kate Beahan as Enzo
 Kazimir Sas as Henry
 Khan Chittenden as Leo
 Clinton Voss as Desmond
 Claire Sprunt as Jess
 Igor Sas as Robert     
 Gillian Alexy as Sharon 
 Joseph Atherden as Phillip 
 Nicolette Findley as Edwina
 Kahren Hampton as Helen 
 Alan Rosenwald as Eric
 Steele Sciberras as Billy

See also
 List of Australian television series

References

External links
 

Australian children's television series
Nine Network original programming
Australian Broadcasting Corporation original programming
Television shows set in Perth, Western Australia
1997 Australian television series debuts
1997 Australian television series endings
Television series by Beyond Television Productions